KIM University re-branded (December 2015) from Kigali Institute of Management (KIM) formerly International College of Accountancy and Management (ICAM) is a private institution of Higher Learning offering post-secondary education and training in Business Management and related disciplines in Rwanda. The Institution was registered in 2003 as a non-profit making organization under the law No. 20/2000 of 26/7/2000.

History 

The KIM University is located 12 km from the center of Kigali City at Nyandungu on Kigali-Kayonza road. Currently KIMU offers a four-year degree programme in Bachelor of Business Management (BBM) with two different specializations namely; Accounting, Finance & banking, and Procurement & Logistics management. KIM University plans to introduce more Bachelor of Business Management degree option in areas such as Economics, Human Resource Management, and Entrepreneurship. KIM University has more than 1000 students with a hope to increase the numbers.

Undergraduate programs

 Bachelor of Business Management(BBM) with specialization in:
      -Accounting
      -Finance and Banking
      -Procurement and Logistics Management
 Bachelor of Science in Computer Science with Specialization in:
      -Information Technology
      -Information System
      -Computer Science
 Bachelor of Science in Economics with Specialization in:
      -Health Economic
      -Labour & Demography
      -Financial Economics
      -Agricultural Economics
      -Environmental Economics
 Bachelor of Science in Logistics and Supply Chain Management

Post graduate programs
 Masters in Business Administration - Accounting & Finance
 Masters in Business Administration - Marketing Management
 Masters in Business Administration - Logistics & Supply Chain
 Masters in Business Administration - Human Resource Management
 Masters in Business Administration - Project Management
 Masters in Business Administration - Strategic Management

Professional Courses

 Certified Accounting Technician (CAT) ICPAR
 Accounting Technicians Diploma (ATD) KASNEB
 Certified Public Accountant (CPA) ICPAR
 Certified Public Accountant (CPA) KASNEB
 Chartered Institute of Procurement & Supply (CIPS-UK)
 Certified Procurement and  Supply Professional of Kenya (CPSPK) 
 Diploma in Credit Management  (DCM) KASNEB 
 Diploma In Information Communication  Technology- (DICT)  KASNEB
 Certified Information Communication Technologist (CICT) KASNEB
 Certified Investment and Financial Analysts (CIFA) KASNEB
 Certified Credit Professionals (CCP) KASNEB
 Investment and Securities Technicians (IST) KASNEB CISCO
 Diploma  and  Certificates in  Insurance – Kenyan College of Insurance

References

External links
 
 Ministry of Education, Rwanda
 Rwanda Education Commons, Rwanda
  International Network of Higher Education In Africa

Universities in Rwanda
Education in Kigali
Universities and colleges in Rwanda
Educational institutions established in 2006
2006 establishments in Rwanda